The Central Electricity Authority of India (CEA) advises the government on policy matters and formulates plans for the development of electricity systems. It is a statutory organisation constituted under section 3(1) of Electricity Supply Act 1948, which has been superseded by section 70(1) of the Electricity Act 2003. 

Officers from the Central Power Engineering Services Cadre, recruited through Engineering Services Examination conducted by the Union Public Service Commission, are posted to the Central Electricity Authority of India.

Responsibilities
Under the Electricity Act 2003, CEA prescribes the standards on matters such as construction of electrical plants, electric lines and connectivity to the grid, installation and operation of meters and safety and grid standards. The CEA is also responsible for concurrence of hydro power development schemes of central, state and private sectors taking into consideration the factors which will result in efficient development of the river and its tributaries for power generation, consistent with the requirement of drinking water, irrigation, navigation and flood control.

Preparation of technical standards for construction of electrical plants, electric lines and connectivity to the grid is the responsibility of CEA as per section 73 (b) of the Electricity Act, 2003. However as per section 7 of this Act, a generating company may establish, operate and maintain a generating station if it complies with the technical standards only relating to connectivity to the grid as given in clause (b) of section 73. This implies that generating stations need not follow compulsory the CEA technical standards specified for construction of electrical plants and electric lines. Similarly, transmission / distribution licensees need not implement compulsory the standards for construction of electric lines except the Grid Code/ Grid Standards for the operation and maintenance of transmission lines specified by CEA under clause 73 (d) of this Act. Many times, these CEA standards are conservative compromising optimum design features /cost/ utility and also do not give full clarity in selection of the system / sub system capabilities of electrical plants and electric line.

The CEA plays a lead role in promoting the integrated operations of the regional power grids and the evolution of a national grid. The eastern, western and north-eastern grids have been integrated and are operating in a synchronous mode. The eastern grid is connected to the northern as well as southern grid through HVDC back to back links. The western grid is also connected to the northern and southern grid through similar arrangements. The CEA facilitates exchange of power within the country from surplus to deficit regions and with neighbouring countries for mutual benefits.
   
The CEA advises central government, state governments and regulatory commissions on all technical matters relating to generation, transmission and distribution of electricity. It also advises state governments, licensees or generating companies  on matters which enable them to operate and maintain the electricity system under their ownership or control in an improved manner.

CEA responsibility also includes reliable data collection/ management/dissemination of the power sector. However, there is major mismatches  (CEA data is nearly 5% more than NLDC data) in the basic electricity data given by CEA and NLDC as shown below.

As per Central Electricity Authority of India data, on October 5, out of 135 thermal plants that use coal for power generation, 106 or nearly 80 per cent are either in critical or super critical stage, i.e. they have stocks only for the next 6-7 days. The combined power capacity of these 106 power projects is 1,33,849 MW.

There is also wide mismatch in source-wise generation and total generation data presented in daily reports of CEA and NLDC. The definitions of terminology used is not available in these web sites.

See also
Electricity sector in India

References

India
Government agencies for energy (India)
Electric power in India
Ministry of Power (India)